Guess Who's Coming to Dinner is a 1967 American film.

Guess Who's Coming to Dinner may also refer to:

Television

Canada
 "Guess Who's Coming to Dinner", an 18 to Life episode
 "Guess Who's Coming to Dinner", a The Best Years episode
 "Guess Who’s Coming to Dinner?", a Dinner Party Wars episode
 "Guess Who's Coming to Dinner", a Sophie episode

United Kingdom
 "Guess Who's Coming to Dinner", a Citizen Smith episode
 "Guess Who's Coming to Dinner?", a Close to Home episode
 "Guess Who's Coming to Dinner?", a The Cuckoo Waltz episode
 "Guess Who's Coming to Dinner", a No, Honestly episode
 "Guess Who's Coming to Dinner?", a This Life episode
 "Guess Who's Coming to Dinner?", a Whatever Happened to the Likely Lads? episode

United States
 "Guess Who's Coming to Dinner", a Baywatch episode
 "Guess Who's Coming to Dinner", a Braxton Family Values episode
 "Guess Who's Coming to Dinner?", a The Brothers Garcia episode
 "Guess Who's Coming to Dinner" (Dawson's Creek)
 "Guess Who's Coming to Dinner (Honkey Edition)", an Elvis and Slick Monty episode
 "Guess Who's Coming to Dinner?", an Empty Nest episode, guest-starring Phil Hartman
 "Guess Who's Coming to Dinner?", a The Facts of Life episode
 "Guess Who's Coming to Dinner" (Grey's Anatomy)
 "Guess Who's Coming to Dinner?", a Growing Pains episode
 "Guess Who's Coming to Dinner?", a Hudson Street episode
 "The Buttmans: Guess Who's Coming to Dinner?", an In Living Color sketch
 "Guess Who's Coming to Dinner?", a The Joe Schmo Show episode
 "Guess Who's Coming to Dinner?", a Kyle XY episode
 "Guess Who's Coming to Dinner?", a Last Man Standing episode
 "Guess Who's Coming to Dinner?", a The Life and Times of Eddie Roberts episode
 "Guess Who's Coming to Dinner?", a One World episode, guest starring James Avery
 "Guess Who's Coming to Dinner" (Scandal)
 "Guess Who's Coming to Dinner", a The Secret Diary of Desmond Pfeiffer episode
 "Guess Who's Coming to Dinner?", a Step by Step episode
 "Guess Who's Coming to Dinner", a Thunder Alley episode
 "Guess Who's Coming to Dinner?", a Tyler Perry's House of Payne episode
 "Guess Who's Coming to Dinner?", a Working Girl episode

Other countries
 "Guess Who's Coming to Dinner", a McLeod's Daughters episode
 Guess Who's Coming to Dinner?, a New Zealand programme broadcast by TVNZ

Music
 Guess Who's Coming to Dinner (album), by Black Uhuru
 Guess Who's Comin' to Dinner?, an album by DJ Cash Money
 Guess Who's Coming to Dinner?, an album by King Gordy with Fat Killahz
 "Guess Who's Coming to Dinner", a single by Dr. Alban

Film
 Guess Who's Coming to Dinner, a film screened at the 1993 Tokyo International Lesbian & Gay Film Festival

See also 
 "Guess Hoe's Coming to Dinner", a The Boondocks episode
 Guess Who's Coming for Dinner (disambiguation)
 Guess Who's Not Coming to Dinner (disambiguation)
 Guess Who (disambiguation)
 Guess Who's Coming to Breakfast (disambiguation)
 Guess Who's Coming to Lunch (disambiguation)
 Guess Who's Coming to Visit (disambiguation)